Odet Philippe was the first permanent, non-native settler on the  Pinellas peninsula in what is now the state of Florida, acquiring  of land in what is today Safety Harbor in 1842. He was a successful businessman who introduced cigar making and citrus to the Tampa Bay region. His descendants, including the McMullen and Booth families (for whom McMullen-Booth Road is named), are among the county’s most well known pioneer clans.

Philippe was buried in Philippe Park – his former plantation – in 1869, but the exact location of the gravesite is unknown.

Grave marker inscription
Odet Philippe
Born Lyon, France, 1787
Died at this Site 1869

As the first European 
settler in Pinellas County
he established St. Helena 
Plantation, now Philippe Park 
Philippe was the first 
to cultivate grapefruit 
in Florida and introduced 
cigar-making to Tampa 
His descendants populated 
this frontier. He was 
said to be a doctor 
and of noble birth

Gallery

References

Who was Odet Philippe?
Odet Phillipe Marker

See also
Philippe Park
Safety Harbor site

1787 births
1869 deaths
Citrus farmers from Florida
Florida pioneers
Businesspeople from Lyon
People from Pinellas County, Florida
French emigrants to the United States